"The Ride" is a song by Polish singer Rafał Brzozowski. The song represented Poland in the Eurovision Song Contest 2021 in Rotterdam, the Netherlands.

Eurovision Song Contest

Internal selection
On 12 March 2021, Telewizja Polska confirmed that Rafał Brzozowski would represent Poland in the 2021 contest.

At Eurovision
The 65th edition of the Eurovision Song Contest took place in Rotterdam, the Netherlands and consisted of two semi-finals on 18 and 20 May 2021, and the grand final on 22 May 2021. On 17 November 2020, it was announced that Poland would be performing in the first half of the second semi-final of the contest.

Clara Rubensson version
Parallel to the version of "The Ride" by Rafał Brzozowski, there is an alternative version of this song with a different arrangement, performed by its co-author, Swedish singer Clara Rubensson. This version appeared on 11 March 2021 that is just before the release of the Polish singer's version as a leak made by one of the music sites.
In an interview published on 23 April 2021 for the eurowizja.org portal belonging to the OGAE Polska association, the songwriters revealed that the song was created in 2020 and was ready at the beginning of October with the original purpose for Clara Rubensson (which was to be the fourth single in her output), but with a view to Eurovision Song Contest the song was taken over by Rafał Brzozowski.
On 16 July 2021 on the Swedish music market the song "The Ride" by Clara Rubensson was released as a bonus to her cover of the song entitled "Love in Siberia" from the repertoire of the Danish band Laban, the original version of the song was released in 1985.

References

2021 songs
2021 singles
Eurovision songs of 2021
Eurovision songs of Poland